Hot Set is an American reality television game show on the Syfy cable network in which a group of production artists compete against each other to create movie sets. Ben Mankiewicz serves as the show's host, with judges being Curt Beech, Lilly Kilvert, and Barry Robison.

Each week, the artists must build a "hot set" that tests their artistry and techniques to create a fully functioning film set to match a theme over the course of 3 days, using a budget of $15,000. The first two days allows for concept design and building, a third day of filming and judging. The judges then have the opportunity to look at the sets from afar and up close. One artist will be deemed the winner, receiving a cash reward of $10,000.

Episodes

References

External links

2012 American television series debuts
2010s American reality television series
Syfy original programming
English-language television shows
2012 American television series endings